Macracanthorhynchus, also known as the giant thorny-headed worm of swine,  is a member of the 
Oligacanthorhynchidae which contains many species. One species, M. hirudinaceus, is a parasite which lives in the intestines of pigs and other suids, and very occasionally in humans or dogs. It causes enteritis, gastritis or peritonitis. Its life cycle includes beetles of the genus Melolontha as intermediate hosts. This species has many synonyms which include: Echinorhynchus gigas (Block, 1782), Macracanthorhynchus gigas (Block, 1782), Echinorhynchus hirundinacea (Palas, 1781), Gigantorhynchus hirundinaceus (Pallas, 1781), Gigantorhynchus gigas (Block, 1782), Hormorhynchus gigas (Block, 1782), Taenia haeruca (Pallas, 1776), and Taenia hirundinaceus (Pallas, 1781) The complete mitochondrial genome of M. hirudinaceus has been sequenced. The eggs have 4 membranes are 98 μm long and have an elongation ratio of 1.85.

Another species, M. ingens, has eggs which have 3 membranes are 94 μm long and have an elongation ratio of 1.66. It parasitizes the raccoon (Procyon lotor) in the United States.

References

Archiacanthocephala
Acanthocephala genera